Michaela Polleres (born 15 July 1997) is an Austrian judoka. In 2021, she won the silver medal in the women's 70 kg event at the 2020 Summer Olympics in Tokyo, Japan. She is also a bronze medalist at the 2021 World Judo Championships and the 2018 European Judo Championships. She is a third degree black belt.

Career
She won one of the bronze medals in the girls' 63 kg event at the 2014 Summer Youth Olympics held in Nanjing, China. She also competed in the mixed team event.

She competed in the women's 70 kg event at the 2017 European Judo Championships held in Warsaw, Poland. She was eliminated in her second match by Sanne van Dijke of the Netherlands. In that same year, she won the silver medal in the women's 70 kg event at the 2017 European U23 Judo Championships held in Podgorica, Montenegro.

In 2018, she won the gold medal in the women's 70 kg event at the European U23 Judo Championships held in Győr, Hungary. She represented Austria at the 2019 European Games held in Minsk, Belarus. She won one of the bronze medals in the mixed team event.

In 2020, she was eliminated in her first match in the women's 70 kg event at the European Judo Championships held in Prague, Czech Republic. She competed in the same event at the 2021 Judo World Masters held in Doha, Qatar.

In 2021, she won one of the bronze medals in the women's 70 kg event at the World Judo Championships held in Budapest, Hungary. She won the silver medal in the women's 70 kg event at the 2020 Summer Olympics in Tokyo, Japan.

She lost her bronze medal match in her event at the 2022 Judo Grand Slam Tel Aviv held in Tel Aviv, Israel.

References

External links
  Official Website
 
 
 

Living people
1997 births
Place of birth missing (living people)
Austrian female judoka
Judoka at the 2014 Summer Youth Olympics
Judoka at the 2019 European Games
European Games medalists in judo
European Games bronze medalists for Austria
Judoka at the 2020 Summer Olympics
Olympic judoka of Austria
Medalists at the 2020 Summer Olympics
Olympic silver medalists for Austria
Olympic medalists in judo
21st-century Austrian women